Nakada Yoshinao (中田喜直, Shibuya, Tokyo, 1 August 1923 – 3 May 2000) was a Japanese composer.

Works, editions and recordings
 Japanese Festival - Seventeen Piano Pieces for Students
 Songs - Songs of Japanese Toys; 6 Children's Songs; 8 Children's
 Tanpopo to a poem of Miyoshi Tatsuji

References

1923 births
2000 deaths
20th-century Japanese composers
20th-century Japanese male musicians
Japanese male composers